The 2010–11 Bosnia and Herzegovina Hockey League was the 3rd season of the Bosnia and Herzegovina Hockey League (BHL). It ran from January 7, 2011 until March 26, 2011, with the playoffs following on March 25 to March 26. HK Bosna won their second title after defeating HK Alfa 2–0 in the best of three playoff series.

League business
For the 2010–11 season all games will be played at the Olympic Hall Zetra. The league employs modified rules. Games last for 45 minutes without a stopping clock, and contact in play and slapshots are not allowed. The maximum players that a team can have on their list in 15. The season opened with the three teams returning from the previous season with each team to play ten games before the top two teams enter the playoffs. During mid-January a fourth team, HK Ilidža 2010, joined the league, resulting in a revised schedule. The season was expanded with each team playing 15 games before the playoffs.

Following on from the previous season the three teams continued to play under their nicknames. HK Bosna plays under the name Lisice sa Općine Centar, HK Alfa plays under the name Medvjedi iz Novog Sarajeva, and HK Stari Grad plays under the name Vukovi sa Starog Grada. HK Ilidža 2010 will play under their original name.

During the 2010–11 season the teams will also compete in the Jaroslav Jandourek Cup, the national cup which is named after the former coach of HK Bosna coach Jaroslav Jandourek. Three games will be held from March 16 to March 23. HK Alfa was drawn against HK Ilidža 2010 while HK Bosna was drawn against HK Stari Grad. The winners of the two games advance to the final. HK Ilidža 2010 went on to win the Cup after defeating HK Bosna 2–1 in the final.

Regular season
The regular season consisted of each team playing 15 games, with five games against each other team. Following the completion of regular season the top two teams in the standings progress to a three game playoff series. HK Bosna secured first place in the standings after beating HK Ilidža 2010 2 – 1 in their final game. HK Alfa finished in second place to advance to the playoffs after beating HK Stari Grad 4 – 3 with the final goal coming from a shootout. HK Alfa finished a point ahead of HK Stari Grad causing HK Stari Grad to be unable to defend last seasons title.

Standings

January

February

March

Playoffs
HK Bosna and HK Alfa qualified for the playoffs after finishing first and second in the regular season standings respectively. HK Bosna won the best of three championship series in two games.

References

External links
Official site 

Bosnia and Herzegovina Hockey League seasons
Bos
2010–11 in Bosnia and Herzegovina ice hockey